Beyond the Door (Italian: Chi sei?, lit. "Who are you?") is a 1974 supernatural horror film directed by Ovidio G. Assonitis and Roberto Piazzoli, and starring Juliet Mills, Gabriele Lavia, and Richard Johnson. The plot follows a San Francisco housewife who becomes demonically possessed in the midst of a pregnancy. The film was a co-production between the United States and Italy. It was released in the United Kingdom in an extended cut under the title Devil Within Her.

Beyond the Door opened in the United States in May 1975, and became a major commercial success, grossing approximately $15 million. Critical reaction to the film was largely negative, with numerous critics deeming it an imitation of The Exorcist (1973). That film's distributor, Warner Bros., filed a lawsuit against the production company behind Beyond the Door, claiming copyright infringement. A settlement was ultimately reached years later in 1979.

This would be the first entry into the Beyond the Door trilogy in the United States as Mario Bava's Shock (1977) was re-titled Beyond the Door II and branded as a sequel, though it has no relation to the 1974 film. A second sequel, Beyond the Door III, was also released in 1989, though it too bears no relation to the previous two films.

Plot
Jessica Barrett, a young English mother living in San Francisco, reveals to her music executive husband, Robert, that she is pregnant. The couple already have two young children: a son, Ken, and daughter, Gail. Several days later, during Ken's birthday party, Robert finds Jessica violently ill and vomiting in the bathroom. After visiting Dr. George Staton, her obstetrician and personal friend, Jessica is informed that she is in fact three months pregnant, not the mere weeks she believed.

Over the course of her pregnancy, Jessica finds herself subject to violent mood swings, apparent hallucinations of voices, and poltergeist phenomenon. On one occasion, Jessica is awoken by disembodied wheezing, and levitates into the air and wheezes violently all through her house. George confides in a worried Robert that Jessica's pregnancy is progressing at an unbelievably rapid rate. Fearing for her wellbeing, George arranges for Jessica to spend time with his wife, Barbara, hoping she will confide in her.

Jessica tells George she wants an abortion, but swiftly vacillates, accusing him of being a murderer when he agrees to an abortion should he find the pregnancy a hazard to her health. The Barrett household soon becomes a hotbed of supernatural activity that terrorizes both Gail and Ken when their father is away. Meanwhile, Jessica exhibits increasingly horrifying behavior akin to demonic possession, such as inhumanly twisting her head, wheezing and projectile vomiting.

Robert is contacted by a mysterious man named Dimitri who instructs him to sequester Jessica in their house and keep visitors away, assuring that the child is born. Jessica grows progressively ill, exhibiting a fever, stomach ailments, and other bizarre symptoms, and becomes bedridden. Under Dimitri's instructions, George has Jessica placed in a straitjacket to prevent her from violently lashing out. When George visits her, Jessica alternately pleads for his help before cursing at him in a deep, demonic voice. George has Jessica undergo a series of tests, including scans of her brain, but none of them show any neurological anomalies.

After Robert is subject to a torrent of violent supernatural behavior from Jessica, it is revealed that Dimitri is a lover from Jessica's past, and that he is a Satanist who has arranged for her to give birth to the Antichrist, in exchange for the demonic spirit having saved him from dying in a car accident years prior. In a violent confrontation between Jessica and Dimitri, the demonic entity turns on him, and implies that all of the events that have taken place were arranged for its own amusement. The entity murders Dimitri before departing Jessica's body, after which she immediately has a stillbirth.

Some time later, a healthy Jessica accompanies Robert and their children on a boat ride in the San Francisco Bay. Ken unwraps a gift he earlier acquired on his birthday, concealed in black wrapping paper with a gold ribbon. The gift is revealed to be a red toy car, the same model Dimitri crashed in the accident that nearly claimed his life. Ken drops the toy car over the edge of the boat railing, and his eyes glow green.

Cast

Production
The screenplay for Beyond the Door was written by Ovidio G. Assonitis (billed as O. Hellman), Antonio Troiso, and Robert Barrett. A number of collaborating writers also assisted, including Alex Rebar, Giorgio Marini, Aldo Crudo, and Christopher Cruise.

The interior shots were filmed on set in Italy at the Incir De Paolis Studios in Rome, while all exteriors were shot on location in San Francisco.

Detailing a woman possessed by a demon, Beyond The Door was labeled a rip-off of The Exorcist (1973). Warner Bros. filed a lawsuit in August 1975 seeking an injunction and $2 million in damages, claiming it unfairly competed with The Exorcist and for copyright infringement. The lawsuit was ultimately settled in the favor of Warner Bros. with the studio receiving a cash settlement from A-Erre Cinematografica s.r.l. and a portion of the film's future revenue.

Release
Beyond the Door first opened in Italy under the title Chi Sei?. American International Pictures initially expressed interest in distributing the film, but Film Ventures International ultimately acquired the film for distribution in the United States for $100,000. The cut released theatrically in the United States runs 97 minutes. It was shown as early as May 2, 1975 in Houston, Texas.

Box office
Beyond the Door was a commercial success in the United States, where it earned $15 million at the box office.

Critical response
The film was panned upon release. Roger Ebert of the Chicago Sun-Times gave the movie 1 star out of 4, calling it "scary trash".

Bill DeIsle of The Times-Record also compared the film unfavorably to The Exorcist, panning the script and also noting the special effects as juvenile and laughable. Linda Gross of the Los Angeles Times drew similar comparisons, also noting the film's score as "obtrusive", but conceded that Mills plays her role "with credibility". The San Francisco Examiners Jeanne Miller also noted the film as being highly derivative, adding that "even with all the so-called 'action', the film is incredibly boring, especially in long philosophical rantings by Johnson about Satanic power. Director Oliver Hellman and screenwriter Richard Barrett display no trace of skill, imagination or originality. The performances are on the same level".

In the years since the film's theatrical release, the film had undergone a mild critical reevaluation with Peter Bradshaw of The Guardian awarding the film 3 stars and saying "there are lots of redundant and silly moments, but some disturbing and interesting stuff as well". Reviewing the film for Little White Lies, Anton Bitel remarked "Beyond The Door is too odd, too indefinable, too singular, to be dismissed as merely derivative".

Home media
Code Red DVD acquired the rights to Beyond The Door. The 2-disc DVD set was released on 16 September 2008 and featured both the international cut (running 109 minutes) and the abridged U.S. theatrical cut (running 97 minutes); it also features interviews with Assonitis, Johnson, writer Alex Rebar, and Mills, as well as commentaries with Assonitis and Mills. Code Red reissued a new transfer of the film on Blu-ray in 2017.

Arrow Video released a Blu-ray edition in the United States and United Kingdom. The 2-disc release, limited to 3,000 units, features both the unabridged international cut, as well as an exclusive U.S. theatrical cut on two separate discs. The second disc also includes Italy Possessed, a newly commissioned feature-length documentary on Italian exorcism films. The Blu-ray set was released on 7 April 2020.

Soundtrack
The score was composed by Franco Micalizzi. The score is unusual for a horror film and at times seems to be referencing funk and disco music that may have been popular at the time. The full soundtrack has been released on vinyl, CD, and more recently on iTunes. The track list is as follows:

"Bargain With The Devil"
"Jessica's Theme"
"Dimitry's Theme"
"Robert's Theme"
"Jessica's Theme"
"Family's Theme"
"Bargain With The Devil" (orchestra)
"Flute Sequence"
"Dimitry's Theme" (slow version)
"Family's Theme" (slow version)

Related works

Beyond the Door II (1977)

To cash in on the success of Beyond The Door, Film Ventures International purchased the U.S. Mario Bava's Italian horror film Shock and retitled it as Beyond The Door II. The film was intended for a late 1977 release to capitalise on the success of Exorcist II: The Heretic, but when that film bombed at the box office, plans to release Shock in the U.S were shelved. The film was eventually given a limited release in 1979.  Truthfully the film had no ties or connections to Beyond The Door aside from sharing one actor, David Colin Jr., who plays a completely different character in each film.

Beyond the Door III (1989)

Beyond the Door III was released in 1989. Scripted by Sheila Goldberg and directed by Jeff Kwitny, the film was shot in Serbia under the title "The Train". The film, again had no ties to either of the previous two. Ovidio G. Assonitis acted as producer on the film and financed it through his company Trihoof Investments. It is also known as Death Train and Amok Train. It was retitled for its U.S. release by RCA/Columbia Pictures Home Video and went straight to video. Although only retitled in the U.S., all modern Blu-ray carry the title Beyond the Door III on the prints, including the Region 1 DVD by Shriek Show.

Embryo: Beyond the Door (2022)
In 2021, Ovidio G. Assonitis announced that an official follow-up to the original film was in development. Juliet Mills was also confirmed to reprise her role in the sequel.

See also
 List of American films of 1974

References

Sources

External links
 
 
 
 Beyond the Door at Variety Distribution

1974 films
1974 horror films
American pregnancy films
American supernatural horror films
Italian supernatural horror films
English-language Italian films
Fictional depictions of the Antichrist
Films about spirit possession
Films involved in plagiarism controversies
Films scored by Franco Micalizzi
Films set in San Francisco
Films shot in San Francisco
Films shot in Rome
1970s pregnancy films
Italian pregnancy films
1974 directorial debut films
1970s American films
1970s Italian films